The 2004–05 ISU Short Track Speed Skating World Cup was a multi-race tournament over a season for short track speed skating. The season began on 30 September 2005 and ended on 20 November 2005. The World Cup was organised by the International Skating Union who also ran world cups and championships in speed skating and figure skating.

The World Cup consisted of four tournaments in this season, rather than six, due to the  2006 Winter Olympics.

Calendar

Men

China

Korea

Italy

Netherlands

Women

China

Korea

Italy

Netherlands

Overall Standings

Men

Women

See also
 Short track speed skating at the 2006 Winter Olympics
 2006 World Short Track Speed Skating Championships
 2006 World Short Track Speed Skating Team Championships
 2006 European Short Track Speed Skating Championships

References

External Links
 Results for 2005-2006 SEASON at the International Skating Union

ISU Short Track Speed Skating World Cup
2005 in short track speed skating
2006 in short track speed skating